The 1924 Sam Houston State Bearkats football team represented Sam Houston State Teachers College (now known as Sam Houston State University) as a member of the Texas Intercollegiate Athletic Association (TIAA) during the 1924 college football season. Led by second-year head coach J. W. Jones, the Bearkats compiled an overall record of 2–5–1 with a mark of 1–3–1 in conference play, and finished in 13th place in the TIAA.

Schedule

References

Sam Houston State
Sam Houston Bearkats football seasons
Sam Houston State Bearkats football